Phyllogyalidea is a genus of lichens in the family Gomphillaceae. It was circumscribed in 2008 by lichenologists Robert Lücking and André Aptroot, with Phyllogyalidea epiphylla designated as the type species. P. phyllophila was recorded from the Shakhe River valley (Krasnodar Territory, Western Transcaucasia) in 2016.

References

Ostropales
Lichen genera
Taxa described in 2008
Ostropales genera
Taxa named by André Aptroot
Taxa named by Robert Lücking